The Floyd B. Olson House is a historic house located at 1914 West 49th Street in Minneapolis, Minnesota. It was listed on the National Register of Historic Places on December 31, 1974.

Description and history 
It was originally the residence of Floyd B. Olson, who was Minnesota Farmer-Labor Party governor from 1931 to 1936. It is a bungalow with an unusual ornamental feature: it has two classically inspired pillars that support an arched roof over the entrance.

References

Houses completed in 1922
Houses in Minneapolis
Houses on the National Register of Historic Places in Minnesota
National Register of Historic Places in Minneapolis
American Craftsman architecture in Minnesota
Governor of Minnesota